Daxin is a town under the administration of Zhangjiagang, Jiangsu, China. , it has four residential communities and ten villages under its administration:
Daxin Community
Changxin Community
Xindong Community
Xinnan Community
Daxin Village
Duanshan Village
Chaodongweigang Village
Xinzha Village
Xinhaiba Village
Longtan Village
Zhongshan Village
Qiaotou Village
Changfeng Village
Xinkai Village

References 

Township-level divisions of Jiangsu
Zhangjiagang